Auguste de Laissardière (15 April 1881 – 21 June 1964) was a French equestrian and cavalry officer. He competed in the team jumping event at the 1920 Summer Olympics.

He fought during both World War I and World War II. Assigned to the Cavalry School at Saumur in June 1940, he prevented the capture of the school's horses after the French defeat.

References

External links
 

1881 births
1964 deaths
French male equestrians
Olympic equestrians of France
Equestrians at the 1920 Summer Olympics
Sportspeople from Yonne
French colonels
Officiers of the Légion d'honneur
Recipients of the Croix de Guerre 1914–1918 (France)